Sanctified and Chicken-Fried by Joe R. Lansdale is a compilation of short stories told in his inimitable Mojo style of suspense, horror, and humor.  Published in 2009 by University of Texas Press, Austin, Texas. The forward is written by Joe’s long-time friend Bill Crider.

The book contains the following stories:

Mister Weed-Eater
Tight Little Stitches in a Dead Man’s Back
The Big Blow
The Magic Wagon (excerpt)
Dirt Devils
The Pit
Night They Missed the Horror Show
Bubba Ho-Tep
The Fat Man and the Elephant
A Fine Dark Line (excerpt)
White Mule, Spotted Pig

References

External links
Author's Official Website

Short story collections by Joe R. Lansdale
American short stories
2009 short story collections
Horror short story collections
Works by Joe R. Lansdale